The York City Ice Arena is a 1,000-seat rink in York, Pennsylvania, U.S. Renovated in September 2004, it hosts local public skating, ice hockey, and figure skating.  It was the home field of the York Capitals in the AIF from 2013 to 2015 before the team moved to Harrisburg as the Central Penn Capitals. College Hockey East held their inaugural season playoffs at York City Ice Arena in February 2014. The arena received brief international media coverage after a player's upset parent broke a panel of safety glass during a hockey game on January 19, 2015.

References

External links
York City Ice Arena

2001 establishments in Pennsylvania
Buildings and structures in York, Pennsylvania
Indoor arenas in Pennsylvania
Indoor ice hockey venues in Pennsylvania
Sports in York, Pennsylvania
Sports venues completed in 2001
Sports venues in Pennsylvania